Mark Woodforde was the defending champion, but did not participate this year.

Michael Chang won the title, beating Paul Haarhuis 6–3, 6–2 in the final.

Seeds

Draw

Finals

Top half

Bottom half

References

 Main Draw

U.S. Pro Indoor
1994 ATP Tour